Lieutenant General Sir Alexander Hamilton-Gordon KCB (6 July 1859 – 13 February 1939) was a British general during World War I.

Early life
Hamilton-Gordon was one of ten children of General Sir Alexander Hamilton-Gordon, K.C.B. and Caroline Herschel. His paternal grandfather was George Hamilton-Gordon, 4th Earl of Aberdeen, Prime Minister of the United Kingdom from 1852 until 1855. His maternal grandfather was John Herschel.

Military career
Educated at Winchester College, Hamilton-Gordon was commissioned into the Royal Artillery in 1880. His first military service was in the Second Anglo-Afghan War in 1880. Hamilton-Gordon later served in the Boer War taking part in actions at Ladysmith, Spion Kop, Vaal Kranz and Tugela Heights. He became Deputy Assistant Adjutant General for Intelligence in South Africa in early 1901. Arriving back in the United Kingdom, he briefly became an instructor at the School of Gunnery before he was appointed a Deputy Assistant Quarter-Master-General at Aldershot in October 1901.

In 1910, he took a posting as Director of Military Operations in India, where he served until 1914, when he became General Officer Commanding-in-Chief for Aldershot Command. In 1916, he was given command of IX Corps, serving at the Battle of Messines and the Third Battle of the Aisne. He was relieved in 1918 and retired in 1920.

He died in 1939.

Family
In 1888, he married Isabel Newmarch, with whom he had three children.

References

|-
 

1859 births
1939 deaths
People educated at Winchester College
British military personnel of the Second Anglo-Afghan War
British Army personnel of the Second Boer War
British Army generals of World War I
Knights Commander of the Order of the Bath
Chevaliers of the Légion d'honneur
Royal Artillery officers
British Army lieutenant generals
Herschel family